Jaime Ramon Misa Paredes, better known simply as Jim Paredes, is a Filipino singer, composer, television host, writer and actor. He is known as one of the members of popular musical trio APO Hiking Society along with Danny Javier and Boboy Garovillo. Regarded as one of the pillars and icons of Original Pilipino Music (OPM). He is the son of Ester Paredes Jimenez, a staunch martial law activist.

Paredes' most prominent collaboration work under the Apo Hiking Society and multuple artists called, Handog ng Pilipino sa Mundo, became the anthem of the peaceful People Power Revolution that overthrew the regime of Ferdinand Marcos. It was participated in by 15 Filipino artists in April of that year, and its English version "A New and Better Way" was launched in Australia a few months after. In recognition of its significance, the lyrics of the song are embedded on a wall of the EDSA Shrine, a chapel commemorating the revolution. Paredes' other compositions includes When I Met You, Panalangin, Batang-Bata Ka Pa, Yakap sa Dilim, Mahirap Magmahal Ng Syota Ng Iba, San' Na Nga Ba'ng Barkada Ngayon, Blue Jeans, and Nakapagtataka.

Filmography

Television
Paredes' most prominent television appearances include:
Sa Linggo nAPO Sila (1990-1995) - Host (ABS-CBN)
Tatak Pilipino (1990-1994) - Host (ABS-CBN)
'Sang Linggo nAPO Sila (1995-1998) - Host (ABS-CBN)
Search for the Star in a Million (2005) - Judge (ABS-CBN)
Pinoy Dream Academy (2006) - Headmaster (ABS-CBN)
Maalaala Mo Kaya (Episode: "Kalapati", 2010) - Don Pepe (ABS-CBN)
Pilyang Kerubin (2010) - Ronaldo Esteban (GMA Network)
A Beautiful Affair (2012) - Stephen Saavedra (ABS-CBN)
Pyra: Ang Babaeng Apoy (2013) - Don Del Fierro (GMA Network)
Give Love On Christmas Presents: The Exchange Gift (2014) - ???? (ABS-CBN)
FPJ's Ang Probinsyano (2021) - PGen. Eduardo Singson (Chief of PNP) (Kapamilya Channel)

Film
Must Date The Playboy (2015) ... Andy Andres (StarFlix)
EDSA 1986: Mga Tinig ng Himagsikan (2006)
Di Ako lsa Ba Nyo (2019)

Bibliography
Humming in My Universe: Random Takes on Everything
Between Blinks
Writing on Water
As Is Where Is

Discography
Ako Lang (1996)
Laro (2011)

Controversy
In April 2019, Paredes attracted controversy after a sex video that showed him masturbating was leaked in social media by the person whom he was having an illicit video call with. After initially denying the video's authenticity, he later apologized for the video.

References

External links

Living people
APO Hiking Society members
Ateneo de Manila University alumni
Filipino human rights activists
Filipino columnists
20th-century Filipino male singers
Filipino people of Basque descent
Filipino people of Spanish descent
Filipino singer-songwriters
Filipino television personalities
Filipino television variety show hosts
ABS-CBN personalities
GMA Network personalities
Filipino writers
Manila sound musicians
People from Quezon City
Singers from Metro Manila
The Philippine Star people
21st-century Filipino male singers
Year of birth missing (living people)
Filipino OPM composers
Filipino songwriters